Biagota (born  920) was probably the wife of duke Boleslaus I of Bohemia.

Michal Lutovský writes in his book Bratrovrah a tvůrce státu (Fratricide and country-maker) that only a few coins confirm the existence of Biagota.

These coins are considered the oldest type of Přemyslid denar. An inscription can be read on them, BIAGOTACOIIIIX or BIAGOTACOVIIX, meaning BIAGOTA CONIVNX: wife Biagota. Possibly these coins were made on the occasion of marriage, but there is no proof for it.

It is not even sure that Biagota was the mother of all four adult children of Boleslaus I (Dobrawa, Boleslaus II of Bohemia, Strachkvas and Mlada of Bohemia). Her origins are unclear. She could have originated from one of the German states of the Holy Roman Empire or from a Slavic country (Blahota or Bjegota was an old Bulgarian name). Both hypotheses could be right, corresponding to the contemporary practice of European rulers.

Literature 
 Petráň, Z. První české mince. Prague, 1998.
 Lutovský, M. Bratrovrah a tvůrce státu : život a doba knížete Boleslava I. 1. vyd. Prague: Set out, 1998. 162 pp.

References

900s births
Year of birth uncertain
Year of death missing
Duchesses of Bohemia
10th-century Bohemian women